Wee Willie can refer to:
Wee Willie Winkie, a Scottish nursery rhyme character
Wee Willie Smith (1911–1992), American basketball player
Wee Willie Smith (American football) (1910–1996), American football player

Nicknames
Bill Shoemaker, an American jockey
Ervin Williams, a rockabilly musician

Major League Baseball players
Willie Keeler
Willie Bloomquist
Willie Sudhoff